EDX may refer to:

Science and technology
 Electrodiagnostic medicine, a method of medical diagnosis
 Energy-dispersive X-ray spectroscopy, an analytical technique for elemental analysis or chemical characterization
 Event Driven Executive, a software application development system for the IBM Series/1 minicomputer
 EDX register, a data register on the x86 (IA-32) microprocessor architecture

Other uses
 edX, a company that provides massive open online courses
 EDX (DJ) (Maurizio Colella, born 1976), Swiss DJ and producer
 EDX London, a defunct derivatives exchange